The men's 73 kg competition at the 2022 European Judo Championships was held on 30 April at the Armeets Arena.

Results

Finals

Repechage

Pool A

Pool B

Pool C

Pool D

References

External links
 

M73
European Judo Championships Men's Lightweight